Karel Cornelis Berkhoff (born 1965) is a senior researcher at NIOD Institute for War, Holocaust and Genocide Studies  in Amsterdam.

Berkhoff studied history and Russian studies at the University of Amsterdam, Soviet Studies at Harvard University and graduated in 1998 as a historian at the University of Toronto, studying under Paul Robert Magocsi, Chair of Ukrainian Studies. He studies primarily World War II in Russia and Eastern Europe. He was an advisor to the ZDF documentary "Holocaust" (2000).

Selected publications
"Ukraine under Nazi Rule (1941–1944): Sources and Finding Aids" (in Jahrbücher für Geschichte Osteuropas, vol. 45, nr. 1 en nr. 2, 1997) 
"The ‘Russian’ Prisoners of War in Nazi-Ruled Ukraine as Victims of Genocidal Massacre" (in Holocaust and Genocide Studies, vol. 15, nr. 1, 2001)
"Harvest of Despair:  Life and Death in Ukraine Under Nazi Rule" (Harvard University Press, 2004)
"Motherland in Danger: Soviet Propaganda During World War II" (Harvard University Press, 2012 - )

Awards
Fraenkel Prize in Contemporary History, 2001 from the Wiener Library for the book Harvest of Despair:  Life and Death in Ukraine Under Nazi Rule.

References

1965 births
Living people
20th-century Dutch historians
Historians of Ukraine
University of Amsterdam alumni
Harvard University alumni
University of Toronto alumni
21st-century Dutch historians